March TMD was a railway traction maintenance depot situated near March, England. March was a steam locomotive shed under British Railways with the depot code 31B; the depot code of the diesel depot under BR was MR. The nearest railway station is March, and the depot was located close to the Whitemoor Marshalling Yard.  Despite its rural location, in the 1970s it accommodated a similar number of locomotives to the comparatively larger Toton TMD and served as the main diesel depot for East Anglia.

History
March Shed was built by the Great Eastern Railway as part of the redevelopment of local railway facilities in the mid-1880s, when the construction of a new, larger station at March had meant that the earlier engine shed had had to be demolished.  Construction of the new shed included realigning the branch line to Wisbech further west and replacing a level crossing at Norwood Road with a bridge. The new shed was a brick built 6 track straight shed with a triple gable style slate roof.  It was provided with the 2 northerly roads as through and the other 4 roads dead-ended on the west side.  In 1900 a turntable was provided on the north side of the shed yard, being enlarged to 70 foot in 1925 when a corrugated asbestos clad 4 track straight through shed was added along the north side of the original building.

After the 1923 Grouping the London and North Eastern Railway built a new locomotive shed in Hundred Road with a Mitchell Conveyor and Transporter Co mechanical coaling plant for the engines, with an associated electricity generating plant. The entire line became part of the Great Eastern Railway in 1862. The former GER engine shed was retained to undertake heavy repairs.   A brick built 5 track straight through washout shed was added in 1933. A water softener with a capacity of 11,700 gallons per hour was added in 1939, at a cost of over £12,000.

World War Two
March Shed was considered of strategic importance in both operational and national level.  The LNER diesel shunters, locomotives which included a large switching board at the rear of the cab to enable them to be used as mobile power stations in the event of bomb damage affecting local supplies, were delivered new to March.  Due to locomotive examination problems caused by the wartime blackout the shed was provided with an Illuminated Loco Inspection Pit, generally referred to as the Light Tunnel.  This building contained six rows of tube lights, two on either wall and one on either side of the pit.  This building remained in use until the end of steam.

During the Second World War a number of US Army Class S160 (USATC S160 Class) 2-8-0s were allocated to the shed during 1943 and 1944 in the run up to the invasion of Europe.

Dieselisation
With the arrival of diesel shunters, Roads 1 and 2 were dedicated for their use.  As more diesel locomotives entered service the first four roads were partitioned off, with all diesel maintenance and repairs taking place there.  Forty Brush Type 2 diesels were based at the depot by the early 1960s.  Diesel locomotives were fuelled on site despite the lack of spillage trays and the timber beams of the old steam shed.  In 1962 a steel-framed diesel depot was built on the site of the original shed, complete with spillage trays and oil drainage facilities. In 1987, the 4 track extension to the original shed was also demolished and replaced by a purpose-built diesel facility.

The depot was closed in 1992 with the withdrawal of remaining Speedlink (wagon load traffic). This meant that the depot had no work.

However, in 2003, Whitemoor Yard re-opened and on 18 April 2008 GB Railfreight (a freight operating company and part of FirstGroup) officially opened their new depot at March. This is located in the former goods shed in the former Down Yard to the east of March station and was opened by Ian Coucher, then chairman of Network Rail.

Shed codes
The following shed codes have been used to identify locomotives allocated to March:

References

Railway depots in England